Lóránt Vincze (born 3 November 1977) is a Romanian politician currently serving as a Member of the European Parliament for the Democratic Union of Hungarians in Romania.

Vincze belongs to the Hungarian minority in Romania, and serves also as the president of the Federal Union of European Nationalities (FUEN).

References

1977 births
Living people
MEPs for Romania 2019–2024
Democratic Union of Hungarians in Romania MEPs
Democratic Union of Hungarians in Romania politicians
People from Târgu Mureș